Hans Jaroszewicz (4 January 1935 – 22 June 2003) was a German professional racing cyclist. He rode in the 1960 and 1961 Tour de France.

References

External links
 

1935 births
2003 deaths
German male cyclists
Cyclists from Berlin